Onanie Bomb Meets the Sex Pistols is a compilation record by the Japanese noise rock band Boredoms, released in 1994 in both Japan and the United States. It combines the band's first album, Osorezan no Stooges Kyo, with its first EP, Anal by Anal. It was rereleased in 2004 by Very Friendly Records in the United Kingdom.

Track listing
"Wipe Out Shock Shoppers" – 0:21
"Boredom, Vs, Sdi" – 3:23
"We Never Sleep" – 2:10
"Bite My Bollocks" – 2:24
"Young Assouls" – 6:03
"Call Me God" – 3:18
"No Core Punk" – 1:11
"Lick'n Cock Boatpeople" – 5:11
"Melt Down Boogie" – 4:50
"Feedbackfuck" – 6:33
"Anal Eater" – 3:17
"God from Anal" – 3:09
"Born to Anal" – 2:42

References

1994 compilation albums
Boredoms albums
Reprise Records compilation albums
Warner Records compilation albums